The 2010 ISSA basketball tournament was a basketball tournament of the Iloilo Schools Sports Association. Six schools in group A and five schools in group B of the high school division participated. The tournament was hosted by Central Philippine University. Games were held at the De Paul College gym, CPU gym and Iloilo Sports Complex Basketball center. The tournament was held from August 10 through September 14 or 17th, 2010. The champion of group B will go up to group A for the next tournament, while the last place team in group A will be relegated to group B.

Round robin elimination group A

Round robin elimination group B

Playoffs

Playoffs

References

Iloilo Schools Sports Association
Sports in Iloilo